Elizabeth the Queen is a 1968 TV movie presented on Hallmark Hall of Fame. It is an adaptation of the 1930 play Elizabeth the Queen by Maxwell Anderson. The film was directed by George Schaefer.

Cast
Judith Anderson as Queen Elizabeth I
Charlton Heston as Robert Devereaux, Earl of Essex
Michael Allinson as Sir Walter Raleigh
Alan Caillou as Burbage
Jody Carter as Lady In Waiting
Peter Church as Hemmings
Dana Elcar as Captain Marvel
Lynn Harper as Ann Rousseau
Harvey Jason as Herald
Donald Marlatt as Irish Courier
Anne Rogers as Penelope
Gilchrist Stuart as Physician
Harry Townes as Sir Robert Cecil

Production
In 1964 George Schaefer said he had decided not to do a production of this or another Maxwell Anderson play, Mary Queen of Scot, because they depended on pageantry, which was hard to do on television.

Schaefer changed his mind and Judith Anderson signed to star in a production in May 1967. It was her third production for the Hallmark Hall of Fame following Macbeth and The Cradle Song. She had performed in the play the year before in New York and received poor reviews but insisted the production was faulty rather than the play itself. Charlton Heston agreed to co star.

References

External links
Elizabeth the Queen at IMDb
Elizabeth the Queen at BFI

Films about Elizabeth I
1968 television films
1968 films
Films directed by George Schaefer
Hallmark Hall of Fame episodes